"Close to You" is a song by English reggae singer Maxi Priest. It was released in 1990 as the lead single from his fifth album Bonafide (1990). "Close to You" reached number one on the US Billboard Hot 100, number two on the Australian ARIA Singles Chart, and number seven on the UK Singles Chart.

Critical reception
Ron Wynn from AllMusic said the song "is more pop/R&B with a reggae touch than it is real reggae." A reviewer from Music & Media commented, "After a tougher than normal start, this song quickly becomes another Maxi Priest single like all the others. Nice melody and well sung." David Giles from Music Week wrote, "A discernible step in the soul direction from the reggae maestro. Though the emphasis is still firmly on melody and honeyed vocals, the rhythm leans dancefloor-wards. Very commercial."

Music videos
The music video features Priest singing while the background features people in Egypt. There is also a second version, which takes place inside of a soundstage. The song was also featured in the film Sleeping with the Enemy.

Track listings
7-inch single
 "Close to You" (Radio Mix) – 3:59
 "I Know Love" featuring Tiger – 4:07

12-inch maxi-single
 "Close to You" (Phil Bodger Main Body Mix) – 5:28
 "Close to You" (Leo Grant Bad-Ass Mix) – 6:00
 "Close to You" (Leo Grant Acappella & Drum Mix) – 5:56
 "Close to You" (Phil Bodger Radio Mix) – 3:59
 "Close to You" (Phil Chill's Rap Sensation) – 6:08
 "Close to You" (Bodger's bonus beats) – 4:03
 "I Know Love" – 4:07

CD maxi-single
 "Close to You"
 "Close to You" (Extended Version)
 "I Know Love"
 "Close to You" (Phil Chill's Rap Sensation Mix featuring Darren Deere)

CD maxi-single – Remixes
 "Close to You" (Phill Chill's Rap Sensation) – 6:08
 "Close to You" (Bodger's Radio Edit) – 4:06
 "I Know Love" (Steven Stanley Jamaican Mix) – 5:06
 "Sure Fire Love" – 3:55

12-inch maxi-single – Remixes
 "Close to You" (Phill Chill's Rap Sensation) – 6:08
 "Close to You" (Bodger's Radio Edit) – 4:06
 "I Know Love" (Steven Stanley Jamaican Mix) – 5:06
 "Sure Fire Love" – 3:57

Charts

Weekly charts

Year-end charts

All-time charts

Certifications

Cover versions
In 2003, trance act Origene covered the song. In 2004, American boy band B3 covered the song on their album Living for the Weekend, which also features Maxi Priest on backing vocals. In 2006, Puerto Rican reggaeton group Pachanga covered the song on their album Recontra locos latinos and released it as their second single. In the same year, Dutch singer Jay Delano of hip hop duo R'n'G fame covered the song and released it as his debut solo single of his debut solo album Close to You, released in 2007. In 2014, US group The Uptown Band released a contemporary jazz version of the song which appears on the group's full-length CD Heart, Soul, Body & Mind.

References

1990 songs
1990 singles
Billboard Hot 100 number-one singles
Maxi Priest songs
Charisma Records singles
Songs written by Gary Benson (musician)